Catherine Daisy Coleman (March 30, 1997August 4, 2020) was an American sexual assault victim advocate who was the subject of the 2016 documentary film Audrie & Daisy, for which she received a Cinema Eye Honor. Coleman co-founded the non-profit organization SafeBAE, which was aimed at preventing sexual assault in schools. She died by suicide at the age of 23.

Early life
Coleman was born to Melinda, a veterinarian and Michael Coleman, a physician. She had three brothers. In 2009, Michael, Daisy and one of her brothers were travelling in the car to watch another one of her brothers in a wrestling competition when the car hit black ice and went into a ravine, killing her father. After his death, Coleman and the rest of the family moved to Maryville, Missouri.

2012 sexual assault and investigation
In January 2012, a 17-year-old Maryville, Missouri boy named Matthew Barnett was arrested for the rape and sexual assault of Coleman, then 14. A 15-year-old boy was accused of doing the same to Coleman's 13-year-old friend, and a third boy admitted to recording the assault on a cellphone. A significant controversy arose in 2013 when the county prosecutor dropped felony and misdemeanor charges against the first boy, who was related to an influential former state representative, and the Nodaway County prosecutor dropped the felony sexual exploitation charge against the third boy.

Outrage in online communities, including Anonymous, soon followed when the story surrounding this case was revisited in October 2013. Michael Schaffer, reporting on the incident for The New Republic, described Maryville, Missouri as a "lawless hellhole". In 2014, a special prosecutor was put in charge to reinvestigate the case. The first boy pleaded guilty to misdemeanor second-degree endangerment of the welfare of a child for leaving her outside her house, and was sentenced by Missouri Circuit Court Judge Glen Dietrich to four months in jail that were suspended in favor of two years of probation. He was sentenced in juvenile court for the assault.

Career and activism
Coleman and her older brother Charlie advocated nationwide for sexual assault survivors. HuffPost named Coleman as one of the "13 most Fearless Teens of 2013". Coleman's story was featured in the 2016 Netflix documentary Audrie & Daisy. Coleman and Audrie Pott were recipients of a 2016 Cinema Eye Honor as "unforgettable" memorable non-fiction film subjects. She attended Missouri Valley College. She co-founded SafeBAE (Before Anyone Else), a non-profit organization aimed at ending sexual assaults in schools. In June 2018, Coleman relocated to Colorado Springs, Colorado and was working as a tattoo artist. She worked on a second film project titled Saving Daisy, focusing on her recovery process, post-traumatic stress disorder, and the use of CBD and EMDR therapy.

Personal life and death
After the sexual assault, Coleman attempted suicide on multiple occasions. She became the target of daily bullying, prompting the family to move from Maryville to Albany, Missouri. Her homes had suspicious fire damage in Nodaway and Gentry counties. In June 2018, her younger brother Tristan died in a car accident at 19 years old. 

Coleman died by suicide on August 4, 2020, at the age of 23. On December 6, 2020, her mother Melinda also died by suicide.

Documentary

References

External links
 
 Daisy Coleman's Story: "I Refuse To Be Silenced" in Seventeen magazine: her 2013 narrative of the sexual assault

1997 births
2020 deaths
2020 suicides
Suicides in the United States
21st-century American women artists
Place of death missing
Place of birth missing
People with post-traumatic stress disorder
Missouri Valley College alumni
American women's rights activists
Artists from Missouri
Activists from Missouri
People from Maryville, Missouri
Sexual abuse victim advocates
People from Albany, Missouri
Female suicides